The American Cinema Editors Award for Best Edited Drama Series for Commercial Television is one of the annual awards given by the American Cinema Editors. It has evolved throughout the history of the American Cinema Editors Awards, narrowing it's eligibility field numerous times. 
 From 1962 to 1972, the award did make any distinctions between continual series and/or miniseries or television movies, or the genres of comedy and drama. 
 In 1973, the award became Best Edited Episode from a Television Series, which it would remain from 20 years.
 In 1993, the award started separating series based on their running time, becoming  Best Edited One Hour Series for Television.
 In 2006, a distinction was made between commercial and non-commercial series, resulting in another split.
 In 2018, the category dropped running time distinctions, becoming Best Edited Drama Series for Commercial Television.
 In 2021, the category was awarded as Best Edited Drama Series, dropping any distinction between drama series.

Winners and nominees
 † – indicates the winner of a Primetime Emmy Award.
 ‡ – indicates a nomination for a Primetime Emmy Award.

1960s
Best Edited Television Program

1970s

Best Edited Episode from a Television Series

1980s

1990s

Best Edited One-Hour Series for Television

2000s

Best Edited One-Hour Series for Commercial Television

2010s

Best Edited Drama Series for Commercial Television

2020s

Best Edited Drama Series

Programs with multiple awards

5 awards
 Breaking Bad (AMC)
 M*A*S*H (CBS)

2 awards
 The Big Valley (ABC)
 Chicago Hope (CBS)
 The Dick Powell Show (NBC)
 ER (NBC)
 Hill Street Blues (NBC)
 Killing Eve (BBC America)
 Medical Center (CBS)
 The Sopranos (HBO)
 St. Elsewhere (NBC)
|}

Programs with multiple nominations

11 nominations
 Breaking Bad (AMC)

10 nominations
 Better Call Saul (AMC)
 M*A*S*H (CBS)

7 nominations
 24 (Fox)

5 nominations
 Chicago Hope (CBS)
 The Good Wife (CBS)
 Hill Street Blue (NBC)
 The Sopranos (HBO)

4 nominations
 Cagney & Lacey (CBS)
 ER (NBC)
 Killing Eve (BBC America)
 Law & Order: Special Victims Unit (NBC)
 Lou Grant (CBS)
 The West Wing (NBC)

3 nominations
 The Big Valley (ABC)
 Boston Legal (ABC)
 Cheers (NBC)
 Fargo (FX)
 Friday Night Lights (NBC/The 101 Network)
 Ironside (NBC)
 L.A. Law (NBC)
 Mad Men (AMC)
 Mr. Robot (USA)
 Northern Exposure (CBS)
 St. Elsewhere (NBC)

2 nominations
 Bewitched (ABC)
 Bonanza (NBC)
 Dallas (CBS)
 The Dick Powell Show (NBC)
 The Eleventh Hour (NBC)
 Gunsmoke (CBS)
 Hawaii Five-O (CBS)
 The High Chaparral (NBC)
 In the Heat of the Night (NBC)
 I Spy (NBC)
 Lost (ABC)
 Medical Center (CBS)
 NYPD Blue (ABC)
 Police Story (NBC)
 Rawhide (CBS)
 The Streets of San Francisco (ABC)
 Wagon Train (NBC)
 The Walking Dead (AMC)
 The Waltons (CBS)
 The X-Files (Fox)
 This Is Us (NBC)

References

External links
 

American Cinema Editors Awards